The 2012–13 Sydney Sixers season was the club's second consecutive season in the Big Bash League (BBL).

Players

Squad
Players with international caps are listed in bold.

Note: This table is for the 2012–13 Big Bash League season squad. See also 2012 Champions League Twenty20 squads#Sydney Sixers.

Transfers

In:

Out:

Note: Transfers occurred after the Champions League Twenty20 tournament. Thus players listed as "Out" (excluding MacGill, Bravo and Cowan) competed in the CLT20 tournament and players listed as "In" did not. See also 2012 Champions League Twenty20 squads#Sydney Sixers.

Champions League Twenty20

As winners of the 2011–12 Big Bash League, the Sydney Sixers qualified for the 2012 Champions League Twenty20 series held in South Africa. Corey Richards was the caretaker coach of the Sixers for this tournament as Trevor Bayliss's Indian Premier League team, the Kolkata Knight Riders also qualified. The tournament would prove to be successful for the Sixers, winning the tournament in their first attempt.

Group stage

Ladder 

Source: Wisden

Matches

Finals

Playoff tree

Semi-final

Final

Big Bash League

Regular season

Ladder

Matches 
Times shown are in Australian Western Standard Time (UTC+08) for Perth, Australian Central Daylight Time (UTC+10:30) for Adelaide, Australian Eastern Standard Time (UTC+10:00) for Brisbane and Australian Eastern Daylight Time (UTC+11:00) for all remaining venues.

Finals
The Sixers poor season saw them finish seventh with only three wins. This was not good enough to qualify for the finals series and thus also ensuring they would not be able to defend their Champions League Twenty20 title.

References

External links
Official site

Sydney Sixers seasons